Aricca Vitanza is an Italian-American soccer player. She most recently played in Italy for Pink Sport Time Bari of Serie A (women's football).

Early life

Vitanza started her career playing in AYSO, AYSO Allstars, and Coast Soccer Premier League. She attended Oak Park High School (California) and played on the women's Varsity soccer team where she helped the team become Tri Valley League Champions as well as a CIF Participant. Vitanza won the Tri Valley League Coaches Honorable Mention during her first year on the team.

Playing career

ŽFK Mašinac PZP

Vitanza began her professional career in Nis, Serbia when she signed with top women's club ŽFK Mašinac PZP Niš in 2007. In signing with the club, she made history (along with her sister Catiana Vitanza) by becoming the first female American players to play in the Balkans. She played with Mašinac for the second half of their 2006/2007 season, coming in second place in the league. In 2008, Vitanza again returned to the club and helped them become champions of the Serbian Prva Liga as well as win the Serbian League Cup. She went on to aid Mašinac in UEFA Women's Champions League 2008–09 (formerly known as 2008–09 UEFA Women's Cup).

Torres Calcio Femminile

At the start of the 2008/09 Serie A season, Vitanza signed with Italian club Torres Calcio Femminile. She helped Torres finish in second place in the Scudetto and earn their spot in UEFA Women's Champions League 2009-10. Vitanza also aided Torres in becoming champions of the Supercoppa Italiana competition, in which they defeated rivals A.S.D. CF Bardolino in the finals.
Following Supercoppa competition, Vitanza participated in UEFA Champions League with Torres, in which they went on to defeat champion clubs from various European countries to ultimately reach the quarter-final stage.

Orlandia '97

Vitanza returned to Europe in September 2011 and signed a contract with the newly promoted Italian Serie A club Orlandia '97 for the 2010/2011 season.

SC Heerenveen

Vitanza was invited to play for Dutch Eredivisie club SC Heerenveen for the 2011/2012 season. Her stint at the club had her playing center midfielder.

FCF Como

In September 2012, Vitanza returned to Italy along with her sister Catiana Vitanza and signed with FCF Como for the 2012/2013 season of the Italian Serie A (women's football). She played as an attacking midfielder for the club.

W-League and WPSL

During her off seasons from European play, Vitanza played in the USL W-League and WPSL semi-professional leagues in the United States. Vitanza signed with the two-time USL W-League champions Pali Blues for the 2010 summer season of the W-League. The following year, she played for top WPSL club Ajax America Women for the 2012 Summer season. In May 2014, Vitanza played with Santa Clarita Blue Heat of the USL W-League.

Pink Sport Time Bari

In January 2015, Vitanza signed with Serie A club Pink Sport Time Bari for the second half of the 2014/2015 season.

Personal life

Vitanza has spent most of her youth and professional careers playing alongside her sister Catiana Vitanza.

References

1989 births
Living people
American women's soccer players
Pali Blues players
American people of Italian descent
ŽFK Mašinac PZP Niš players
Expatriate women's footballers in Serbia
Torres Calcio Femminile players
American expatriate sportspeople in Italy
Soccer players from Los Angeles
Serie A (women's football) players
Women's association football midfielders
Women's association football forwards
SC Heerenveen (women) players
Expatriate women's footballers in the Netherlands
Eredivisie (women) players
American expatriate sportspeople in the Netherlands
Sportspeople from Ventura County, California
A.S.D. Pink Sport Time players
Expatriate women's footballers in Italy
21st-century American women
S.S.D. F.C. Como Women players
Ajax America Women players